The Lealt Shale Formation is a Middle Jurassic geologic formation in Scotland.  Fossil ornithopod , theropod and stegosaur tracks, a theropod dinosaur tooth and the pterosaur Dearc have been reported from the formation. The lithology consists of silty fissile mudstones with subordinate thin limestones.

See also

 List of dinosaur-bearing rock formations
 List of stratigraphic units with ornithischian tracks
 Ornithopod tracks

Footnotes

References
 Weishampel, David B.; Dodson, Peter; and Osmólska, Halszka (eds.): The Dinosauria, 2nd, Berkeley: University of California Press. 861 pp. .

Bathonian Stage